Jerome P. Knowles (born July 30, 1948) is a former Republican member of the Pennsylvania House of Representatives for the 124th legislative district. He was first elected in a special election in May, 2009 to fill the vacancy left by Dave Argall who was elected to the Pennsylvania State Senate to succeed the late Senator James J. Rhoades. He defeated his Democratic opponent, Bill Mackey, with more than 70% of the vote.

Prior to his election to the state House, Knowles served as councilman and mayor of Tamaqua, Pennsylvania and later a Schuylkill County commissioner.

Knowles sat on the Judiciary and Local Government committees. He announced in February 2022 that he would not seek re-election. He was succeeded by businessman Jamie Barton.

Political Positions 

Knowles opposes legalizing adult-use cannabis in Pennsylvania, calling it a "dangerous and illegal drug". He also opposes lessening the criminal penalties of cannabis possession. In addition, he introduced a bill that would eliminate state funding to municipalities that support or operate safe injection sites for drug users.

Although during the COVID-19 epidemic, Knowles put out a statement advocating for his constituents to stay vigilant, he voted to end the Governor's emergency stay-at-home order and pushed for the governor to ease restrictions on his county. As public schools began to consider reopening for in-person classes, Knowles began soliciting co-sponsors for legislation that would roll back mandatory mask wearing in schools for young children. Instead, he believes the current mandate to be impractical and advocates for the decision to be made by individuals schools.

He has received pushback from the LGBTQ+ community for his perceived homophobia. In March 2020, he yelled at one of two openly gay lawmakers in the PA House of Representatives, calling him a "little girl" as he was speaking on the floor wearing a rainbow mask. In 2018, he signed onto a letter asking to eliminate LGBTQ+ inclusive birth certificates. The letter asked that Pennsylvania resume issuing birth certificates with the parents listed under a "mother/father" section, instead of the current "parent/parent" section.

Campaigns
Knowles did not face a Democratic challenger in a general election since faced. In the 2020 election, Knowles was challenged by Taylor Picone, an officer of the U.S. Army National Guard. Knoweles defeated Picone significantly, receiving 72.5% of the vote.

References

External links
State.pa.us, Pennsylvania House of Representatives - Jerry Knowles official PA House website

Living people
Republican Party members of the Pennsylvania House of Representatives
Mayors of places in Pennsylvania
People from Tamaqua, Pennsylvania
1948 births
21st-century American politicians